The birch trumpet (Norwegian: neverlur, Swedish: näverlur, Latvian: tās̆u taure, Lithuanian: ragas, daudytė, Finnish: tuohitorvi, Estonian: karjapasun) is a type of natural trumpet made of spruce covered with birch bark, known in Norway, Sweden, Finland, England, Denmark, Latvia, Lithuania, Belarus and Estonia.  Even cruder and less durable versions were made of plain birch bark.  They are associated with the early European Chalet culture, where it was presumably used to intimidate predators, frighten supernatural enemies, and convene council meetings.

Usually, the neverlur is a natural horn, having no fingerholes or valves.  Normally, a player can play 10 tones from the natural scale on the instrument.  In the modern era, the neverlur is primarily a cultural curiosity, used for the occasional fanfare.

In Finland, the birch trumpet, locally known as the tuohitorvi, comes in different varieties. Some instruments are built as natural horns and used for signalling, usually by shepherds, whereas others are built in the style of the mute cornett and have fingerholes for melody playing.

Tolga kulturskole (culture school) in Norway regularly teaches playing the neverlur to all interested people living in the municipality.

The oldest recovered näverlur in Sweden dates back to the 10th century, and resembles earlier bronze trumpets.

Contemporary manufacturers

Norway
 Magnar Storbækken at the company Naturinstrumenter in Tolga

Sweden

 Rune Selén was Sweden's best known näverlur manufacturer. He manufactured more than 11000 näverlurar between 1959 and 2005 when he retired because of dust allergy. He died 28 October 2011. 
 Lisa Byers Runberg in Alunda. She was taught by Rune Selén. Her husband Per Runberg is a folk musician and riksspelman.
 Jan Nordkvist at the company Lurmakaren in Tällberg

Similar and related instruments
 With length up to 4–5 meters are known from the Alps (alphorn), Carpathian Mountains, and Pyrenees.
 Midwinter horn mainly known from the border area between Germany and Netherlands in Bentheim and Twente. It is only played in the period between Advent Sunday and Epiphany
 Büchel (Switzerland)
 Ligawka (Poland)
 Karjapasun (Estonia)
 Trembita

See also 
 Lur

References

External links
 Professional musician Sissel Morken Gullord has specialized in playing the natural horn working with the leading Baroque orchestras in Scandinavia and playing the (never)lur and the billy goat's horn (bukkehorn).
 Sissel Morken Gullord plays the cattle call "Koma guta liggje" on a neverlur on a Norwegian seter (shieling) (YouTube video)
 The Wooden Lurs part of The Nordic Lurs part of O.J.'s Trumpet Page

Natural horns and trumpets
Norwegian musical instruments
Swedish musical instruments
Finnish musical instruments
English musical instruments
Danish musical instruments
Latvian musical instruments

no:Neverlur